Gran Saposoa is the name given to a series of ruins in the Andean cloud forests of the Amazonas region of Peru by American explorer Gene Savoy. Savoy hypothesized that this site is the Pre-Columbian city of Cajamarquilla, built by the Chachapoyas culture, but "Cajamarquilla" is clearly identifiable in historical documents as the renamed modern highland town of Bolívar, Peru. Savoy claims that the ruins, consisting of hundreds of round stone structures, cover approximately 80 square miles (that's about the size of Baltimore, MD). He estimates that the settlement was home to 20,000 occupants.

The ruins of Gran Saposoa were encountered by Savoy and his team in 1999 and the discovery was highly publicized. Savoy received especially harsh criticism from Danish, German and American scholars who were already familiar with the site, and had even documented portions of it. In September 2005, Gene’s son Sean Savoy released a statement to the Associated Press indicating that upon a recent return to the archaeological site at Gran Saposoa, the team found the site had been looted. The news raised criticism not only of the Peruvian government for not adequately protecting the site, but also of Savoy and his team for revealing the location of the site and not providing adequate protection on their own. Protection of archaeological ruins remains an issue in Peru, since looters and black market sellers are extremely well financed.

See also
 Gran Pajaten
 History of Peru

External links
 AP article on looting at Gran Saposoa

Archaeological sites in Peru
Former populated places in Peru
Archaeological sites in Amazonas Region